The Golden Globe Award for Best Limited or Anthology Series or Television Film is one of the annual Golden Globe Awards given to the best miniseries or made-for-television film.

Winners and nominees

1970s
Best Television Film

1980s
Best Miniseries or Television Film

1990s

2000s

2010s

2020s

Programs with multiple awards
2 awards
 American Crime Story

Programs with multiple nominations

3 nominations
 American Crime Story
 Fargo

2 nominations
 American Crime
 American Horror Story
 Top of the Lake

Total awards by network
 HBO – 20
 ABC – 7
 CBS – 5
 PBS – 4
 FX – 3
 NBC – 3
 Amazon Prime Video - 1
 Netflix - 1
 Showtime – 1
 Sundance Channel – 1
 TNT – 1

See also
 Primetime Emmy Award for Outstanding Limited Series
 Primetime Emmy Award for Outstanding Television Movie
 Primetime Emmy Award for Outstanding Miniseries or Movie
 TCA Award for Outstanding Achievement in Movies, Miniseries and Specials

References

Miniseries or Television Film